Rock 'n' Roll is the eighth studio album by English rock band Motörhead, released in August 1987. It is their last album with the GWR label, as more legal issues embroiled the band with yet another label. Reaching only No. 34 in the UK Albums Chart, Rock 'n' Roll was, in that respect, the worst performing of all of Motörhead's top 40 chart hits.

It would see the return of 'classic line up' drummer Phil "Philthy Animal" Taylor, albeit only for a few more years before being fired.

Background
In 1987, Motörhead appeared in the Peter Richardson film Eat the Rich, which starred the regular cast of The Comic Strip and Motörhead frontman Lemmy himself in a small part as "Spider". The band supplied six songs for the soundtrack as well. As the band was about to film their cameo, however, drummer Pete Gill was fired and Phil "Philthy Animal" Taylor rejoined after having quit in 1984. In his autobiography White Line Fever, Lemmy states the sacking of Gill was a long time coming:

Lemmy adds that he knew Taylor, who had been playing with Frankie Miller and ex-Thin Lizzy guitarist Brian "Robbo" Robertson, wanted to come back. Rock 'n' Roll would be the final album recorded by Motörhead on the GWR label and the last before Lemmy would relocate from the UK to Los Angeles.

Recording
Rock 'n' Roll was produced by the band and Guy Bidmead at Master Rock Studios and Redwood Studios in London. In the Motörhead documentary The Guts and the Glory, guitarist Phil Campbell states, "I like it. It's not a great album but... there's things on there I like, a lot of good things I like."

Campbell adds that the studio manager informed them that the studio they were recording in was owned by Michael Palin, and Motörhead – who were all huge Monty Python fans – invited Palin to come down and do a recitation for the album. Palin showed up dressed in a 1940s cricketer outfit, with a V-necked sweater and his hair all brushed to one side. Lemmy remembers Palin walking in and saying, "Hello, what sort of thing are we going to do now, then?" and Lemmy answering "Well, you know in The Meaning of Life, there was this speech that began 'Oh Lord — .'" Palin replied "Ah! Give me some cathedral!" and went in and recorded the 'Oh Lord, look down upon these people from Motörhead' speech.

The song "Eat the Rich" was written specifically for the Richardson film and a music video was released as well (in addition to Lemmy, Koo Stark, Bill Wyman, and Paul McCartney also appear in the film).

In his 2002 memoir, Lemmy assesses the album:

Release
As with the previous two albums it was not a commercial success, even though Lemmy had appeared in a comedy film by the same name as the single, and the sound track to, "Eat The Rich". It continued the downwards momentum of the band into the late eighties, with no original release until 1991, when they made the 1916 album.

Lemmy also writes that Rock 'n' Roll has some great songs, like "Dogs", "Boogeyman", and "Traitor", which they played "for years", but overall it just did not seem to work. According to Joel McIver's 2011 Motörhead biography Overkill: The Untold Story of Motörhead, a court case between the band and GWR was sparked over the choice of a summer single in 1988; the band wanted to release a live performance of "Traitor" from Rock 'n' Roll that was recorded at the Giants of Rock festival in Hämeenlinna, Finland, while the label had wanted to put out a live rendition of the Motörhead classic "Ace of Spades".

Artwork
Joe Petagno had other ideas for the cover of this album:

Reception

While calling Motörhead "a rock & roll band in the purest sense", Eduardo Rivadavia of AllMusic concedes: 

In 2011, Motörhead biographer Joel McIver wrote: 
 
Rock 'n' Roll renewed commercial hope for Motörhead in the United States, with Lemmy moving to Los Angeles after the recording of this album permanently. The fans in the States appeared willing to see this band live and buy their albums whereas Britain is criticised as having lost interest in Motörhead.

In 2016, Classic Rock ranked Rock 'n' Roll as the worst Motörhead album ever made.

Track listing

 The spoken word "Blessing" by Michael Palin is listed on some version as track 5 on side A (the original vinyl and cassette release). On the original CD version it had its own track selection slot (making it a 10-track CD). Otherwise it was at the end of track 4 ("Stone Deaf in the U.S.A.") as a hidden track or at the beginning of track 5 ("The Wolf"). On both of these last two versions it was uncredited on the cover.

Sanctuary Records 2006 2-CD deluxe edition
Disc one is the original album without bonus tracks. B1–B2 are from the B-side of the "Eat the Rich" 12-inch single. B3–B15 are live performances at the Monsters of Rock, Donington Park, England, on 16 August 1986, BBC Radio 1 broadcast on the Friday Rock Show.

 It would be the last time the song "Motörhead" would make it onto the release of a live recording. This compilation was released in 2006 but the show was recorded in 1986, and other than the original broadcast, had not been heard since. "Motörhead" has not been played live, with extremely few exceptions, since this era and the end of the 1980s.

Personnel
Per the album's liner notes.

Motörhead
 Lemmy – bass, vocals, 3rd solo on "Boogeyman"
 Würzel – lead & rhythm guitars, slide guitar on "Stone Deaf in the U.S.A."
 Phil "Wizzö" Campbell – lead & rhythm guitars, slide guitar on "Eat the Rich"
 Phil "Philthy Animal" Taylor – drums
 Pete Gill – drums on Deluxe Edition Tracks 3 - 15
 Michael Palin - speech on "Blessing"

Production
Guy Bidmead – producer
Roland Herrington – engineer
Arabella Rodriguez – engineer
Caroline Orme – engineer
Phil Dane  – engineer
"Eat the Rich" originally recorded by Bill Laswell
Jason Corsaro – recording ("Eat the Rich")
Guy Bidmead – remixing ("Eat the Rich")
Andy Pearce – mastering (2006 remaster)
Motörhead – executive producers
Joe Petagno – Snaggletooth artwork
John F. McGill – layout and design
Curt Evans – 2006 cover design

2006 deluxe edition remaster
 Steve Hammonds – release coordination
 Jon Richards – release coordination
Malcolm Dome – sleeve notes
Mick Stevenson – project consultant, photos and archive memorabilia

Charts

References

External links
 Motörhead official website

Motörhead albums
1987 albums
Albums with cover art by Joe Petagno